Pavlos Kourtidis is a Greek actor based in Athens.

Early life
Pavlos Kourtidis was born in Wuppertal, Germany, and was raised in Thessaloniki Greece, his home town is Pontohrakleia, Paionia municipality. Kourtidis's native language is Greek, and he also speaks both German and English. He studied at ArtsEdLondon. In 1994 he moved in Athens. In 2005, he founded Pavlos Kourtidis Dancetheater in Athens, and in 2009 -2021 he founded PK Theater, also in Neos Kosmos, Athens, Greece.

Movies and television

 (2022/23) "To kokkino potami:I syneheia"
Greek "Το Κόκκινο ποτάμι η συνέχεια" 
Role:Pavlos Hristodoulou
TVseries. 
Director Manousos Manousakis. (GR) 

(2023) "IQ160" 
Role: Nasos Petropoulos (Guest)
TVseries 
Director Pierros Andrakakos. (GR)

 (2023) REMBETIS – DIE GEISTERJÄGER
TVseries. Role: Markos 
Director Jasin Challah.(DE)  

 (2021) "The Flame of the Revolution -1821" Film/Documentary 
Role Theodoros Kolokotronis. Director Manousos Manousakis.(GR)

 (2021) "Vardianos sta Sporka" 
Role "Captain Kostantis" Greek:Βαρδιάνος στα Σπόρκα - Καπετάν Κωνσταντής. 
TV series ERT channel. Director Manousos Manousakis. 
By Alexandros Papadiamantis who was an influential Greek novelist, short-story writer and poet.(GR)

 (2021) "Krisimes Stigmes" Role "radio announcer" (Voice acting)   for TV series ERT channel. 
Written by Galatea Kazantzaki and directed by Manousos Manousakis.(GR)

 (2020/21) "Agries Melisses" season 1 & 2 tvseries, 
Role Lias, Directed by Lefteris Charitos (GR)

 (2021)Man of God (film) 
Role Raggedy Man.Directed by Y.Popovic (USA)

 (2020) "Kala-azar" 
Role Security Man directed by Tzanis Rafailidou(ND/GR)

 (2020) "Megaro" short film 
Role Father directed by Vasilis Kalemos (GR)

 (2019) "Eftihia'' 
Role Zeimpekiko dancer directed by Aggelos Frantzis, inspired by the life of the great Greek songwriter Eftichia Papagianopoulos (GR)

 (2003) "Kleise ta matia" directed by Vasilis Tselemegkos (GR)
 (2004) "To klama vgike apo ton paradeiso" directed by M.Reppas and T.Papathanasiou (GR)

In 2005 he founded Pavlos Kourtidis Dancetheater (formerly Migma). The company's projects are known for combining Greek history and culture with dancetheater through an innovative perspective.

Journalist K. Betinakis spoke of his work on Styx “The choreographies were as brilliant as others – I have watched- like those by Maurice Bejart.”

Theater

Don Camilo 
Theater play 2021
Role:Giovannino Guareschi Greek:Φλουράτος 
Theater Broadway (Athens Greece)

The Clothes 
Theater play 2020
Pavlos Kourtidis - Dimitra Papadima 
Inspired by the book of Efstathia Matsaridou. 
Director: Emmanuel Manios 
Choreography: Zoe Sotiropoulou

GENOCIDE 

GENOCIDE Theater Director, Actor & Choreographer for 15th Nationwide Festival POE at PAOK Sports Arena Thessaloniki - October 2019
GENOCIDE Aesxylia Festival - September 2019 inspired by the city of Elefsina.
GENOCIDE PK Theater Athens - October 2018 - February 2019

A performance based on the true historical facts of the Pontian Greek genocide

“STYX, the goddess of water” 
Inspired the mythological Greek goddess Styx which was presented in 4 tons of water.

LABYRINTH 
 Labyrinth based on Minotaur’s Maze that combined for the first time Cretan traditional dance with contemporary dance based on a realistic maze that represents the union of the ancient with the renovation.
 “Madhouse” that was based on the true story of a man suffering from mental illness in order to communicate against the fear and social exclusion.

Theater
 2021: "Don Camilo" Theater play. Role: Fluratos - Theater Broadway (Athens Greece)

 2020 : Theatre play "The Clothes" Actor at "PK Theater" Athens Greece. Director Emmanuel Manios
 2019 : Actor & Choreographer for 15th Nationwide Dance Festival POE at PAOK Sports Arena Thessaloniki 
 2019 : Genocide - Festival Aisxylia   Elefsina 
 2018-19: Genocide – PK Theater Athens 
 2017: Styx, the goddess of water – PK Theater, open stone theater at Platania Trifilias (Peloponnese)
 2016: Labyrinth, from darkness to light – Pallas Theater
 2015-16: House of Bridges – PK Theater
 2014-15: Madhouse – PK Theater
 2012-13: Dead-end – PK Theater
 2010-11: Frankenstein – PK Theater
 2009-10: Society Says – PK Theater, 11th  International Modern Dance Festival in Egypt (Gomhouria Theatre, Cairo and Sayed Darwish Theatre, Alexandria.
 2008: MONOS – “Polychoros” Theatre of municipality of Athens, Akis Davis Theater
 2007: The Step First Step – “Polychoros” Theatre of municipality of Athens, “Goulandris” natural history museum at Oikopolis awards

References

1973 births
21st-century Greek male actors
Greek choreographers
Living people
Greek theatre directors
Greek male dancers
Actors from Thessaloniki